Manucoco, also referred to as Gunung Manucoco or Mount Manucoco, is a mountain in the Atauro Island subdistrict of the Dili District of East Timor. The rugged topography of the island's highlands is a result of the erosion of uplifted, originally submarine, volcanoes from the Neogene period creating narrow, dissected ridges and steep slopes, with Manucoco forming the highest point. The mountain, along with the whole of Atauro Island, has been identified as an Important Bird Area by BirdLife International because it supports populations of several of Timor’s and Wetar's restricted-range native bird species.

References

Mountains of East Timor
Important Bird Areas of East Timor